Edward Dimock may refer to:
 Edward C. Dimock, American author, linguist, scholar of Asian studies
 Edward Jordan Dimock, American judge